Circumscription may refer to:

Circumscribed circle
Circumscription (logic)
Circumscription (taxonomy)
Circumscription theory, a theory about the origins of the political state in the history of human evolution proposed by the American anthropologist Robert Carneiro
Electoral district